Katrin Saarsalu-Layachi (born on 10 January 1967 in Tallinn) is an Estonian diplomat.

In 1990 she graduated from University of Tartu with a degree in law. Since 1991 she has worked at Estonian Foreign Ministry.

1996-1999 she was a counsellor at the Permanent Representation of Estonia to the European Union. 1999-2003 she was General Director of the Estonian Foreign Ministry's European Integration Department.

2003-2009 she was Ambassador of Estonia to Austria, Slovenia, Slovakia and Switzerland.

Awards:
 2004: Order of the White Star, III class.

References

Living people
1967 births
Estonian women diplomats
Ambassadors of Estonia to Austria
Ambassadors of Estonia to Slovenia
Ambassadors of Estonia to Slovakia
Ambassadors of Estonia to Switzerland
Recipients of the Order of the White Star, 3rd Class
University of Tartu alumni